The Shah Jahan Diamond mined from  Kollur, Golconda—(currently Hyderabad, India). It is a hololithic flat, table cut 56 carat diamond, used as an amulet—(Tawid'th). In late 1600 AD Mughal Emperor Jahangir gifted it to Prince Shah Jahan—(by his name it is known). Currently it is owned by Dar al Athar al Islamiyyah, Kuwait.

History
The diamond is mined in  Kollur, Golconda. It was first recorded when Mughal prince Shah Jahan received it as a gift from his father Mughal Emperor Jahangir who owned it since late 1600 AD, it is seen in a portrait of Shah Jahan of (1592-1666), it came in the possession of Mughal Emperor Aurangzeb and it was evaluated by Jean-Baptiste Tavernier—(17th-century French gem merchant and traveler). Later in 1739 it was brought to Persia after the  Nader Shah invasion of Delhi, It was offered for sale in 1985 in Geneva auction and remained unsold. Currently owned by Dar al Athar al Islamiyyah, Kuwait National Museum, Kuwait.

Dimensions
Height 3.3 centimeter, width 4.6 centimeter and weight 56.72 carat.

See also
 List of diamonds

References
 "Shah Jahan Diamond – 17th century" The Metropolitan Museum of Art, New York City
 Dictionary of Gems and Gemology, page-425, by: Mohsen Manutchehr-Danai, 2013
 Sultans of Deccan India, 1500–1700: Opulence and Fantasy, page-240, by: Navina Najat Haidar and Marika Sardar, 2015

Further reading

 The Shah Jahan Diamond In NYC
 Famous Diamonds
 A diamond that bore the names of three Mughal emperors, 2018, by Parvez Mahmood

Golconda diamonds
Jewels of the Mughal Empire